Jan Nagel (c. 1560–1602) was a Dutch Renaissance painter.

Biography

Nagel was born in Haarlem.  Houbraken mentions him only as the teacher of Claes Jacobsz van der Heck.

According to Karel van Mander, who also mentions him on the last page of his Schilder-boeck as the teacher of Claes Jacobsz van der Heck, he was a follower of the Antwerp painter Cornelis Molenaer, as good as he was at landscape painting, but better at portraits, from either Haarlem or Alkmaar, who died at the Hague in 1602. He spelled his name Ian Nagel or Naghel.

According to the RKD his daughter Neeltge married the painter Sijbert Cornelisz Moninckx, father of Pieter Moninckx, and he became a member of the Guild of Saint Luke in the Hague in 1600, where he later died.

According to the archives of the Haarlem chamber of rhetoric called Trouw moet Blycken, he was a member ("camerist") who painted their oldest achievement of arms from 1593. He died in The Hague.

References

Jan Nagel on Artnet

External links 
 

1560 births
1602 deaths
Dutch Renaissance painters
Artists from Haarlem
Painters from The Hague